Unknown World (a.k.a. Night Without Stars) is a 1951 independently made American black-and-white science fiction adventure film, directed by Terrell O. Morse, and starring Bruce Kellogg, Marilyn Nash, Jim Bannon, and Otto Waldis. Distributed by Lippert Pictures, it was produced by Irving A. Block and Jack Rabin. The film concerns a scientific expedition seeking livable space deep beneath the Earth's surface in the event a nuclear war makes living above ground impossible.

Plot
Dr. Jeremiah Morley is concerned about an imminent nuclear war. He organizes an expedition of scientists and has them use a large atomic-powered tank-like boring machine, called the Cyclotram, capable of drilling down deep through the Earth's surface in order to find an underground environment where humanity could escape and survive a future nuclear holocaust.

The expedition (Andy Ostergaard, Dr. Lindsey, Dr. Bauer, Dr. Paxton, and Dr. Coleman) begins after government funding has fallen through, and they are bailed out at the last minute by private funding from newspaper heir Wright Thompson, who insists on going with them as a lark. Romantic rivalry soon develops between Ostergaard and Thompson for Lindsey, and during the dangerous underground expedition two lives are lost to the perils of their adventure.

In the end the scientists accomplish their goal and find an enormous underground expanse with a plentiful air supply, its own large ocean, and phosphorescent light. However, all the lab rabbits brought with them give birth to dead offspring. Through autopsies, it is discovered that this strange underground world has somehow rendered the rabbits, and hence any other life form, sterile. Dr. Morley is deeply depressed by this news. When an underground volcano suddenly erupts, he fails to enter the safety of the Cyclotram and quickly perishes.

The Cyclotram, carrying the remaining survivors, enters the underground ocean to avoid the eruption. They soon find themselves rising toward the surface of the upper world, having been caught up in a strong, upward-moving ocean current. They eventually break the surface near an unknown tropical island.

Cast
 Victor Kilian (uncredited) as Dr. Jeremiah Morley
 Bruce Kellogg as Wright Thompson
 Otto Waldis as Dr. Max A. Bauer
 Jim Bannon as Andy Ostergaard
 Tom Handley as Dr. James Paxton
 Dick Cogan as Dr. George Coleman
 George Baxter as Carlisle Foundation Chairman
 Marilyn Nash as Dr. Joan Lindsey
 Harold Miller (uncredited) as Carlisle Foundation Board Member

Production
Portions of Unknown World were filmed in Carlsbad Caverns, Bronson Caves, Nichols Canyon, and at Pismo Beach.

Unknown World was put together by two Hollywood special effects men, Jack Rabin and Irving Block, who are two of the film's three producers.

Reception
The B-Movie Review site Million Monkey Theater observed that the "production crew try hard, and it really seems like they have an important message to tell, but the execution and polish are lacking".

Popular culture 
The film is referenced in Season 3, episode 4 of the Netflix series 13 Reasons Why, in which the film is being played at the local movie theater (even though the show takes place in the modern day) and is discussed briefly by the characters. The original theatrical poster for the film is also seen on the wall.

References

Bibliography
 Warren, Bill. Keep Watching The Skies Vol. I: 1950–1957. Jefferson, North Carolina: McFarland & Company, 1982. .

External links

 
 
 Decker, Nathan. Million Monkey Theater. Unknown World A detailed description.

1951 films
American science fiction adventure films
1950s science fiction adventure films
American disaster films
Cold War films
Films scored by Ernest Gold
Films directed by Terry O. Morse
American black-and-white films
Lippert Pictures films
Films about the Hollow Earth
Films set in subterranea
1950s English-language films
1950s American films